Lieutenant-General Humphrey Lyons 
(8 July 1802 – 25 May 1873) was an Indian Army officer.

Military career
Humphrey Lyons was born at St Austins in the English county of Hampshire on 8 July 1802. He was the ninth of twelve sons of John Lyons of Antigua and St Austin's (1760–1816), and Catherine (1763–1803) (née Walrond), daughter of Maine Swete Walrond, 5th Marquis de Vallado. Humphrey's brothers included Admiral John Lyons (1787–1872) and Admiral Edmund Lyons, 1st Baron Lyons.

Lyons went out to India where he entered the 23rd Bombay Native Infantry on 25 May 1817. He was promoted to lieutenant-general on 20 May 1871. He died on 25 May 1873.

Family
Lyons married twice. In 1829, he married Elizabeth Bennett (1798–1859), by whom he had the following children:

Augusta Catherine Lyons, (1827 – 1828)
Edmund Willoughby Lyons (1830–1889). Edmund was a Colonel in the Indian Army. He married twice and had issue.
Sir Algernon McLennan Lyons (1833–1908). Admiral of the Fleet (Royal Navy).
George Maughan Lyons, (1835–1878), Major in the Indian Army.
Henry Maine Lyons, (1837–1838)
Charlotte Salter Lyons, (1839– ?). She married, in 1859, Colonel Alexander Learmonth, by whom she had issue.
Minna Louisa Lyons, (1841–1926). She married, in 1858, Jameson Alers-Hankey, by whom she had issue.

Humphrey Lyons married, secondly, on 7 July 1860, the Hon. Adelaide Matilda Yelverton (1821–1884), the daughter of the 3rd Viscount Avonmore. Humphrey and Adelaide had no issue.

See also
Lyons family

References

1802 births
1873 deaths
People from New Forest District
British Indian Army generals